Events from the year 1828 in France.

Incumbents
 Monarch – Charles X
 Prime Minister – Joseph de Villèle (until 4 January), then Jean Baptiste Gay

Events
4 January - Jean Baptiste Gay, vicomte de Martignac succeeds Jean-Baptiste Guillaume Joseph, comte de Villèle as Prime Minister of France.

Births
8 February - Jules Verne, author (died 1905)
14 February - Edmond François Valentin About, novelist, publicist and journalist (died 1885)
15 April - Jean Danjou, French Foreign Legion (died 1863 in Mexico)
13 June - Elie Delaunay, painter (died 1891)
19 June - Charles Tellier, engineer (died 1913)
17 August - Maria Deraismes, author and pioneer for women's rights (died 1894)
10 November - Hector-Jonathan Crémieux, librettist and playwright (died 1892)
26 November - René Goblet, politician, Prime Minister of France (died 1905)

Full date unknown
Amédée Courbet, admiral (died 1885)
 Louise Laffon, photographer (died 1885)

Deaths
10 January - François de Neufchâteau, statesman, poet, and scientist (born 1750)
29 January - Ambrose Maréchal, third Archbishop of Baltimore, Maryland (born 1764)
15 May - Jean-Pierre Maransin, general (born 1770)
15 July - Jean-Antoine Houdon, sculptor (born 1741)
10 September - Antoine-François Andréossy, general and diplomat (born 1761)
3 November - Jean-Joseph, Marquis Dessolles, statesman and Prime Minister (born 1767)
31 December - Louis-Benoît Picard, playwright (born 1769)

Full date unknown
Joseph Frédéric Bérard, physician and philosopher (born 1789)
François Antoine de Boissy d'Anglas, statesman (born 1756)

See also

References

1820s in France